SC Silvolde is a football club from Silvolde, Netherlands. SC Silvolde plays in the 2017–18 Sunday Hoofdklasse A.

References

External links
 Official site

Football clubs in the Netherlands
Football clubs in Gelderland
Sport in Oude IJsselstreek
Association football clubs established in 1915
1915 establishments in the Netherlands